Camp Creek is a  tributary of the Chattahoochee River in Fulton County, Georgia.  Rising in College Park, the creek flows west to join the Chattahoochee northeast of Campbellton.

See also
List of rivers of Georgia

References

Rivers of Fulton County, Georgia
Rivers of Georgia (U.S. state)